The Western North Carolina Conference is an Annual Conference (regional episcopal area, similar to a diocese) of the United Methodist Church. This conference serves the western half of the state of North Carolina, with its administrative offices and the office of the bishop being located in Huntersville, North Carolina. It is part of the Southeastern Jurisdictional Conference.

The current presiding Bishop is Bishop Kenneth H Carter.

Higher education support
The Western North Carolina Conference provides funding to five institutions of higher learning:

Bennett College – Greensboro, North Carolina
Brevard College – Brevard, North Carolina
Greensboro College – Greensboro, North Carolina
High Point University – High Point, North Carolina
Pfeiffer University 
Main Campus – Misenheimer, North Carolina
Extension Campus – Charlotte, North Carolina

Districts
The WNC Annual Conference is further subdivided into eight smaller regions, called "districts," which provide further administrative functions for the operation of local churches in cooperation with each other. This structure is vital to Methodism, and is referred to as connectionalism. The districts that comprise the Western North Carolina Conference are:

Appalachian
Blue Ridge
Catawba Valley
Metro
Northern Piedmont
Smoky Mountain
Uwharrie 
Yadkin Valley

Prior to July 2012, the WNC Annual Conference had 15 districts.
Albemarle
Asheville
Charlotte
Gastonia
Greensboro
High Point
Lake Norman 
Lexington
Marion
Northeast
North Wilkesboro
Salisbury
Statesville
Waynesville
Winston-Salem

See also
Annual Conferences of the United Methodist Church

References

External links

Methodism in North Carolina
United Methodist churches in North Carolina
North Carolina
North Carolina